Luigi "Gigi" Riccio (born 28 December 1977) is an Italian football coach and former midfielder and currently the assistant manager of Valencia.

Career
Riccio began his career as a professional in Giarre, before moving to Perugia. In 1997, he had a trial spell at Everton before moving to Rangers in 1998. He made only one appearance as a substitute during a league match against Motherwell on 15 May 1999. Riccio was also an unused substitute as Rangers memorably won the league away at rivals Celtic in May 1999. He left for Belgian club K.S.K. Beveren in 1999.

Back in Italy in 2000 with Pistoiese then on to Ternana, Ancona and finally Piacenza, where he played and has been captain. He played his last match on 29 May 2011 for Sassuolo.

In the summer of 2012 he followed his friend Gennaro Gattuso (which he knew from his time at the Rangers) to the Swiss club Sion. While Gattuso was signed as a player, Riccio was named as the assistant manager.

On 19 June 2013, Riccio again followed Gattuso, this time to Italian Serie B club Palermo. Gattuso was named as the new manager with Gattuso appointing Riccio as his assistant. Riccio followed Gattuso to OFI Crete, Pisa, Milan Primavera, and A.C. Milan's first team. In December 2019, the duo was hired at Napoli, replacing Carlo Ancelotti.

References

External links
Profile at Piacenza

1977 births
Living people
Footballers from Naples
Italian footballers
Italian expatriate footballers
A.S.D. Giarre Calcio 1946 players
A.C. Perugia Calcio players
Rangers F.C. players
K.S.K. Beveren players
U.S. Pistoiese 1921 players
Ternana Calcio players
A.C. Ancona players
Piacenza Calcio 1919 players
U.S. Sassuolo Calcio players
Serie A players
Serie B players
Scottish Premier League players
Belgian Pro League players
Expatriate footballers in Scotland
Expatriate footballers in Belgium
Expatriate footballers in England
Expatriate footballers in Switzerland
Italian expatriate sportspeople in Scotland
Italian expatriate sportspeople in Belgium
Italian expatriate sportspeople in Switzerland
Association football midfielders
Italian football managers
FC Sion managers
FC Sion non-playing staff